The following radio stations broadcast on FM frequency 106.9 MHz:

Argentina
 Mix in Capitán Bermudez, Santa Fe

Australia
 Hill FM in Broken Hill, New South Wales
 4BNE in Brisbane, Queensland
 2XXX in Newcastle, New South Wales
 2UNE in Armidale, New South Wales
 VOX FM in Wollongong, New South Wales

Canada (Channel 295)
 CBAF-FM-19 in Urbainville, Prince Edward Island
 CBL-FM-1 in Huntsville, Ontario
 CBN-FM in St. John's, Newfoundland and Labrador
 CBU-FM-6 in Quesnel, British Columbia
 CFYT-FM in Dawson City, Yukon
 CHKA-FM in Schefferville, Quebec
 CHMA-FM in Sackville, New Brunswick
 CHRQ-FM in Restigouche, Quebec
 CHWF-FM in Nanaimo, British Columbia
 CIBX-FM in Fredericton, New Brunswick
 CIMO-FM-1 in Sherbrooke, Quebec
 CIXX-FM in London, Ontario
 CJHP-FM in High Prairie, Alberta
 CKJF-FM in Quebec City, Quebec
 CKKC-FM in Nelson, British Columbia
 CKKF-FM in Fairview, Alberta
 CKOB-FM in Trois-Rivieres, Quebec
 CKQB-FM in Ottawa, Ontario
 VF2320 in Fording River Mine, British Columbia
 VF2547 in Cawston, British Columbia
 VF7353 in Saskatoon, Saskatchewan

China 
 CNR Business Radio in Rizhao

Malaysia
 Sinar in Sandakan, Sabah
 Suria in Kedah, Perlis & Penang

Mexico
 XHAC-FM in Aguascalientes, Aguascalientes
 XHAPU-FM in Tepeapulco, Hidalgo
 XHAQ-FM in Agua Prieta, Sonora
 XHCVC-FM in Cuernavaca, Morelos
 XHERIO-FM in Ixtlán del Río, Nayarit
 XHERU-FM in Chihuahua, Chihuahua
 XHGUA-FM in Guaymas, Sonora
 XHHT-FM in Ignacio Zaragoza, Tlaxcala
 XHJON-FM in Jonuta, Tabasco
 XHPJ-FM in Monterrey, Nuevo León
 XHQT-FM in Veracruz, Veracruz
 XHREL-FM in Morelia, Michoacán
 XHSCCA-FM in Mexico City
 XHSCCT-FM in Jocotitlán, State of Mexico
 XHSCCQ-FM in La Huerta, Jalisco
 XHSOM-FM in Tlacolula de Matamoros, Oaxaca
 XHVMT-FM in Santiago Juxtlahuaca, Oaxaca

New Zealand
Various low-power stations up to 1 watt

United Kingdom
Drystone Radio in Cowling, North Yorkshire
Silk 106.9 in Macclesfield, Cheshire
Your Radio 103 & 106.9 in Dumbarton

United States (Channel 295)
 KAGA-LP in San Angelo, Texas
 KARP-FM in Dassel, Minnesota
 KASS in Casper, Wyoming
 KAZE in Ore City, Texas
 KBGL in Larned, Kansas
 KBRS in Belle Rose, Louisiana
 KCCJ-LP in Batesville, Arkansas
 KCPK-LP in Pine Mountain Club, California
 KCST-FM in Florence, Oregon
 KDGL in Yucca Valley, California
 KDRX in Laughlin AFB, Texas
 KDVA in Buckeye, Arizona
 KEDG in Alexandria, Louisiana
 KEGK in Wahpeton, North Dakota
 KFRC-FM in San Francisco, California
 KFSE in Kasilof, Alaska
 KGCA-LP in Tumon, Guam
 KHEN-LP in Salida, Colorado
 KHPP-LP in Sterlington, Louisiana
 KHPT in Conroe, Texas
 KHRT-FM in Minot, North Dakota
 KHTT in Muskogee, Oklahoma
 KIGI in Iguigig, Alaska
 KIHK in Rock Valley, Iowa
 KKRB in Klamath Falls, Oregon
 KKYN-FM in Plainview, Texas
 KLCX in Pueblo, Colorado
 KLGD in Stamford, Texas
 KLUB in Bloomington, Texas
 KMOK in Lewiston, Idaho
 KMVE in California City, California
 KMZK in Clifton, Colorado
 KMZZ in Bishop, Texas
 KOOV in Kempner, Texas
 KOPW in Plattsmouth, Nebraska
 KQLB in Los Banos, California
 KRGW in Fairbanks, Alaska
 KRNO in Incline Village, Nevada
 KROC-FM in Rochester, Minnesota
 KRVF in Kerens, Texas
 KRWM in Bremerton, Washington
 KSCY in Four Corners, Montana
 KTIJ in Elk City, Oklahoma
 KTPK in Topeka, Kansas
 KTXY in Jefferson City, Missouri
 KUDV in Bloomfield, Iowa
 KVGQ in Overton, Nevada
 KWEC-LP in Saint Charles, Missouri
 KWKI-LP in Pahrump, Nevada
 KWYI in Kawaihae, Hawaii
 KXFE in Dumas, Arkansas
 KXIO in Clarksville, Arkansas
 KYHO-LP in Poplar Bluff, Missouri
 KYXK in Gurdon, Arkansas
 KZZG-LP in Hugo, Oklahoma
 WAFX in Suffolk, Virginia
 WAXE-LP in St. Albans, West Virginia
 WBIS-LP in Winterville, North Carolina
 WBPT in Homewood, Alabama
 WBQX in Thomaston, Maine
 WCCC (FM) in Hartford, Connecticut
 WDML in Woodlawn, Illinois
 WEXR in Stonewall, Mississippi
 WEZX in Scranton, Pennsylvania
 WFSC-LP in Florence, South Carolina
 WGSW in Americus, Georgia
 WHKL in Crenshaw, Mississippi
 WHRD in Freeport, Illinois
 WIIS in Key West, Florida
 WJDS-LP in Palm Coast, Florida
 WJHF-LP in Florence, Alabama
 WKVP in Camden, New Jersey
 WKXD-FM in Monterey, Tennessee
 WKZA in Lakewood, New York
 WLGE in Baileys Harbor, Wisconsin
 WLGX in Bedford, Virginia
 WLRU-LP in Hillsboro, Ohio
 WMEG in Guayama, Puerto Rico
 WMGU in Southern Pines, North Carolina
 WMIT in Black Mountain, North Carolina
 WMOZ in Moose Lake, Minnesota
 WNNO-FM in Wisconsin Dells, Wisconsin
 WOOA-LP in Albany, New York
 WOOD-FM in Muskegon, Michigan
 WPAK-FM in Tigerton, Wisconsin
 WPLL in Cross City, Florida
 WQTA-LP in Tampa, Florida
 WRBE-FM in Lucedale, Mississippi
 WRPG-LP in Pikeville, North Carolina
 WRQK-FM in Canton, Ohio
 WRXS in Brookfield, Wisconsin
 WSAE in Spring Arbor, Michigan
 WSCY in Moultonborough, New Hampshire
 WSRQ-FM in Zolfo Springs, Florida
 WVSQ in Renovo, Pennsylvania
 WSWT in Peoria, Illinois
 WSYR-FM in Solvay, New York
 WTTL-FM in Madisonville, Kentucky
 WUBB in Bluffton, South Carolina
 WUBN-LP in Wilson, North Carolina
 WUKL in Masontown, Pennsylvania
 WUPM in Ironwood, Michigan
 WVEZ in Saint Matthews, Kentucky
 WVTI in Brighton, Vermont
 WWEG in Myersville, Maryland
 WWSU in Fairborn, Ohio
 WWYN in Mckenzie, Tennessee
 WXXC in Marion, Indiana
 WYPO in Ocean City, Maryland
 WZAA-LP in Jeffersonville, Ohio

References

Lists of radio stations by frequency